Treason is the crime of attacking a state authority to which one owes allegiance. This typically includes acts such as participating in a war against one's native country, attempting to overthrow its government, spying on its military, its diplomats, or its secret services for a hostile and foreign power, or attempting to kill its head of state. A person who commits treason is known in law as a traitor.

Historically, in common law countries, treason also covered the murder of specific social superiors, such as the murder of a husband by his wife or that of a master by his servant. Treason (i.e. disloyalty) against one's monarch was known as high treason and treason against a lesser superior was petty treason. As jurisdictions around the world abolished petty treason, "treason" came to refer to what was historically known as high treason.

At times, the term traitor has been used as a political epithet, regardless of any verifiable treasonable action. In a civil war or insurrection, the winners may deem the losers to be traitors. Likewise the term traitor is used in heated political discussiontypically as a slur against political dissidents, or against officials in power who are perceived as failing to act in the best interest of their constituents. In certain cases, as with the Dolchstoßlegende (Stab-in-the-back myth), the accusation of treason towards a large group of people can be a unifying political message.

History

In English law, high treason was punishable by being hanged, drawn and quartered (men) or burnt at the stake (women), although beheading could be substituted by royal command (usually for royalty and nobility). Those penalties were abolished in 1814, 1790 and 1973 respectively. The penalty was used by later monarchs against people who could reasonably be called traitors. Many of them would now just be considered dissidents.

Christian theology and political thinking until after the Enlightenment considered treason and blasphemy synonymous, as it challenged both the state and the will of God. Kings were considered chosen by God, and to betray one's country was to do the work of Satan.

The words "treason" and "traitor" are derived from the Latin tradere, "to deliver or hand over". Specifically, it is derived from the term "traditors", which refers to bishops and other Christians who turned over sacred scriptures or betrayed their fellow Christians to the Roman authorities under threat of persecution during the Diocletianic Persecution between AD 303 and 305.

Originally, the crime of treason was conceived of as being committed against the monarch; a subject failing in his duty of loyalty to the Sovereign and acting against the Sovereign was deemed to be a traitor. Queens Anne Boleyn and Catherine Howard were executed for treason for adultery against Henry VIII, although most historians regard the evidence against Anne Boleyn and her alleged lovers to be dubious. As asserted in the 18th century trial of Johann Friedrich Struensee in Denmark, a man having sexual relations with a queen can be considered guilty not only of ordinary adultery but also of treason against her husband, the king.

The English Revolution in the 17th century and the French Revolution in the 18th century introduced a radically different concept of loyalty and treason, under which Sovereignty resides with "The Nation" or "The People" - to whom also the Monarch has a duty of loyalty, and for failing which the Monarch, too, could be accused of treason. Charles I in England and Louis XVI in France were found guilty of such treason and duly executed. However, when Charles II was restored to his throne, he considered the revolutionaries who sentenced his father to death as having been traitors in the more traditional sense.

In medieval times, most treason cases were in the context of a kingdom's internal politics. Though helping a foreign monarch against one's own sovereign would also count as treason, such were only a minority among treason cases. Conversely, in modern times, "traitor" and "treason" are mainly used with reference to a person helping an enemy in time of war or conflict.

During the American Revolution, a slave named Billy was sentenced to death on charges of treason to Virginia for having joined the British in their war against the American  colonists - but was eventually pardoned by Thomas Jefferson, then Governor of Virginia. Jefferson accepted the argument, put forward by Billy's well-wishers, that - not being a citizen and not enjoying any of the benefits of being one - Billy owed no loyalty to Virginia and therefore had committed no treason. This was a ground-breaking case, since in earlier similar cases slaves were found guilty of treason and executed.

Under very different circumstances, a similar defense was put forward in the case of William Joyce, nicknamed Lord Haw-Haw, who had broadcast Nazi propaganda to the UK from Germany during the Second World War. Joyce's defence team, appointed by the court, argued that, as an American citizen and naturalised German, Joyce could not be convicted of treason against the British Crown. However, the prosecution successfully argued that, since he had lied about his nationality to obtain a British passport and voted in Britain, Joyce did owe allegiance to the king. Thus, Joyce was convicted of treason, and was eventually hanged.

After Napoleon fell from power for the first time, Marshal Michel Ney swore allegiance to the restored King Louis XVIII, but when the Emperor escaped from Elba, Ney resumed his Napoleonic allegiance, and commanded the French troops at the Battle of Waterloo. After Napoleon was defeated, dethroned, and exiled for the second time in the summer of 1815, Ney was arrested and tried for treason by the Chamber of Peers. In order to save Ney's life, his lawyer André Dupin argued that as Ney's hometown of Sarrelouis had been annexed by Prussia according to the Treaty of Paris of 1815, Ney was now a Prussian, no longer owing allegiance to the King of France and therefore not liable for treason in a French court. Ney ruined his lawyer's effort by interrupting him and stating: "Je suis Français et je resterai Français!" (I am French and I will remain French!). Having refused that defence, Ney was duly found guilty of treason and executed.

Until the late 19th Century, Britain - like various other countries - held to a doctrine of "perpetual allegiance to the sovereign", dating back to feudal times, under which British subjects, owing loyalty to the British Monarch, remained such even if they emigrated to another country and took its citizenship. This became a hotly debated issue in the aftermath of the 1867 Fenian Rising, when Irish-Americans who had gone to Ireland to participate in the uprising and were caught were charged with treason, as the British authorities considered them to be British subjects. This outraged many Irish-Americans, to which the British responded by pointing out that, just like British law, American law also recognized perpetual allegiance. As a result, Congress passed the Expatriation Act of 1868, which granted Americans the right to freely renounce their U.S. citizenship. Britain followed suit with a similar law, and years later, signed a treaty agreeing to treat British subjects who had become U.S. citizens as no longer holding British nationality - and thus no longer liable to a charge of treason.

Many nations' laws mention various types of treason. "Crimes Related to Insurrection" is the internal treason, and may include a coup d'état. "Crimes Related to Foreign Aggression" is the treason of cooperating with foreign aggression positively regardless of the national inside and outside. "Crimes Related to Inducement of Foreign Aggression" is the crime of communicating with aliens secretly to cause foreign aggression or menace. Depending on the country, conspiracy is added to these.

In individual jurisdictions

Australia
In Australia, there are federal and state laws against treason, specifically in the states of New South Wales, South Australia and Victoria. Similarly to Treason laws in the United States, citizens of Australia owe allegiance to their sovereign at the federal and state level.

The federal law defining treason in Australia is provided under section 80.1 of the Criminal Code, contained in the schedule of the Commonwealth Criminal Code Act 1995. It defines treason as follows:

A person is not guilty of treason under paragraphs (e), (f) or (h) if their assistance or intended assistance is purely humanitarian in nature.

The maximum penalty for treason is life imprisonment. Section 80.1AC of the Act creates the related offence of treachery.

New South Wales
The Treason Act 1351, the Treason Act 1795 and the Treason Act 1817 form part of the law of New South Wales. The Treason Act 1795 and the Treason Act 1817 have been repealed by Section 11 of the Crimes Act 1900, except in so far as they relate to the compassing, imagining, inventing, devising, or intending death or destruction, or any bodily harm tending to death or destruction, maim, or wounding, imprisonment, or restraint of the person of the heirs and successors of King George III of the United Kingdom, and the expressing, uttering, or declaring of such compassings, imaginations, inventions, devices, or intentions, or any of them.

Section 12 of the Crimes Act 1900 (NSW) creates an offence which is derived from section 3 of the Treason Felony Act 1848:

Section 16 provides that nothing in Part 2 repeals or affects anything enacted by the Treason Act 1351 (25 Edw.3 c. 2). This section reproduces section 6 of the Treason Felony Act 1848.

Victoria
The offence of treason was created by section 9A(1) of the Crimes Act 1958. It is punishable by a maximum penalty of life imprisonment.

South Australia
In South Australia, treason is defined under Section 7 of the South Australia Criminal Law Consolidation Act 1935 and punished under Section 10A. Any person convicted of treason against South Australia will receive a mandatory sentence of life imprisonment.

Brazil
According to Brazilian law, treason is the crime of disloyalty by a citizen to the Federal Republic of Brazil, applying to combatants of the Brazilian military forces. Treason during wartime is the only crime for which a person can be sentenced to death (see capital punishment in Brazil).

The only military person in the history of Brazil to be convicted of treason was Carlos Lamarca, an army captain who deserted to become the leader of a communist-terrorist guerrilla against the military government.

Canada
Section 46 of the Criminal Code has two degrees of treason, called "high treason" and "treason." However, both of these belong to the historical category of high treason, as opposed to petty treason which does not exist in Canadian law. Section 46 reads as follows:
High treason
(1) Every one commits high treason who, in Canada,
(a) kills or attempts to kill His Majesty, or does him any bodily harm tending to death or destruction, maims or wounds him, or imprisons or restrains him;
(b) levies war against Canada or does any act preparatory thereto; or
(c) assists an enemy at war with Canada, or any armed forces against whom Canadian Forces are engaged in hostilities, whether or not a state of war exists between Canada and the country whose forces they are.
Treason
 (2) Every one commits treason who, in Canada,
(a) uses force or violence for the purpose of overthrowing the government of Canada or a province;
(b) without lawful authority, communicates or makes available to an agent of a state other than Canada, military or scientific information or any sketch, plan, model, article, note or document of a military or scientific character that he knows or ought to know may be used by that state for a purpose prejudicial to the safety or defence of Canada;
(c) conspires with any person to commit high treason or to do anything mentioned in paragraph (a);
(d) forms an intention to do anything that is high treason or that is mentioned in paragraph (a) and manifests that intention by an overt act; or
(e) conspires with any person to do anything mentioned in paragraph (b) or forms an intention to do anything mentioned in paragraph (b) and manifests that intention by an overt act.

It is also illegal for a Canadian citizen or a person who owes allegiance to Her Majesty in right of Canada to do any of the above outside Canada.

The penalty for high treason is life imprisonment. The penalty for treason is imprisonment up to a maximum of life, or up to 14 years for conduct under subsection (2)(b) or (e) in peacetime.

Finland
Finnish law distinguishes between two types of treasonable offences: maanpetos, treachery in war, and valtiopetos, an attack against the constitutional order. The terms maanpetos and valtiopetos are unofficially translated as treason and high treason, respectively. Both are punishable by imprisonment, and if aggravated, by life imprisonment.

Maanpetos (translates literally to betrayal of land) consists in joining enemy armed forces, making war against Finland, or serving or collaborating with the enemy. Maanpetos proper can only be committed under conditions of war or the threat of war. Espionage, disclosure of a national secret, and certain other related offences are separately defined under the same rubric in the Finnish criminal code.

Valtiopetos (translates literally to betrayal of state) consists in using violence or the threat of violence, or unconstitutional means, to bring about the overthrow of the Finnish constitution or to overthrow the president, cabinet or parliament or to prevent them from performing their functions.

France

Article 411-1 of the French Penal Code defines treason as follows:
The acts defined by articles 411-2 to 411–11 constitute treason where they are committed by a French national or a soldier in the service of France, and constitute espionage where they are committed by any other person.

Article 411-2 prohibits "handing over troops belonging to the French armed forces, or all or part of the national territory, to a foreign power, to a foreign organisation or to an organisation under foreign control, or to their agents". It is punishable by life imprisonment and a fine of €750,000. Generally parole is not available until 18 years of a life sentence have elapsed.

Articles 411–3 to 411–10 define various other crimes of collaboration with the enemy, sabotage, and the like. These are punishable with imprisonment for between seven and 30 years. Article 411-11 make it a crime to incite any of the above crimes.

Besides treason and espionage, there are many other crimes dealing with national security, insurrection, terrorism and so on. These are all to be found in Book IV of the code.

Germany
German law differentiates between two types of treason: "High treason" (Hochverrat) and "treason" (Landesverrat). High treason, as defined in Section 81 of the German criminal code is defined as an attempt against the existence or the constitutional order of the Federal Republic of Germany that is carried out either with the use of violence or the threat of violence. It carries a penalty of life imprisonment or a fixed term of at least ten years. In less serious cases, the penalty is 1–10 years in prison. German criminal law also criminalises high treason against a German state. Preparation of either types of the crime is criminal and carries a penalty of up to five years.

The other type of treason, Landesverrat is defined in Section 94. It is roughly equivalent to espionage; more precisely, it consists of betraying a secret either directly to a foreign power, or to anyone not allowed to know of it; in the latter case, treason is only committed if the aim of the crime was explicitly to damage the Federal Republic or to favor a foreign power. The crime carries a penalty of one to fifteen years in prison. However, in especially severe cases, life imprisonment or any term of at least five years may be sentenced.

As for many crimes with substantial threats of punishment active repentance is to be considered in mitigation under §83a StGB (Section 83a, Criminal Code).

Notable cases involving Landesverrat are the Weltbühne trial during the Weimar Republic and the Spiegel scandal of 1962. On 30. July 2015, Germany's Public Prosecutor General Harald Range initiated criminal investigation proceedings against the German blog netzpolitik.org.

Hong Kong
Section 2 of the Crime Ordinance provides that levying war against the Government of the Hong Kong Special Administrative Region of the People's Republic of China, conspiring to do so, instigating a foreigner to invade Hong Kong, or assisting any public enemy at war with the HKSAR Government, is treason, punishable with life imprisonment.

Ireland

Article 39 of the Constitution of Ireland (adopted in 1937) states:

treason shall consist only in levying war against the State, or assisting any State or person or inciting or conspiring with any person to levy war against the State, or attempting by force of arms or other violent means to overthrow the organs of government established by the Constitution, or taking part or being concerned in or inciting or conspiring with any person to make or to take part or be concerned in any such attempt.

Following the enactment of the 1937 constitution, the Treason Act 1939 provided for imposition of the death penalty for treason. The Criminal Justice Act 1990 abolished the death penalty, setting the punishment for treason at life imprisonment, with parole in not less than forty years. No person has been charged under the Treason Act. Irish republican legitimatists who refuse to recognise the legitimacy of the Republic of Ireland have been charged with lesser crimes under the Offences against the State Acts 1939–1998.

Italy

The Italian law defines various types of crimes that could be generally described as treason (tradimento), although they are so many and so precisely defined that no one of them is simply called tradimento in the text of Codice Penale (Italian Criminal Code). The treason-type crimes are grouped as "crimes against the personhood of the State" (Crimini contro la personalità dello Stato) in the Second Book, First Title, of the Criminal Code.

Articles 241 to 274 detail crimes against the "international personhood of the State" such as "attempt against wholeness, independence and unity of the State" (art.241), "hostilities against a foreign State bringing the Italian State in danger of war" (art.244), "bribery of a citizen by a foreigner against the national interests" (art.246), and "political or military espionage" (art.257).

Articles 276 to 292 detail crimes against the "domestic personhood of the State", ranging from "attempt on the President of the Republic" (art.271), "attempt with purposes of terrorism or of subversion" (art.280), "attempt against the Constitution" (art.283), "armed insurrection against the power of the State" (art.284), and "civil war" (art.286).

Further articles detail other crimes, especially those of conspiracy, such as "political conspiracy through association" (art.305), or "armed association: creating and participating" (art.306).

The penalties for treason-type crimes before the abolition of the monarchy in 1948 included death as maximum penalty and, for some crimes, as the only penalty possible. Nowadays the maximum penalty is life imprisonment (ergastolo).

Japan
From 1947 Japan does not technically have a law of treason. Instead it has an offence against taking part in foreign aggression against the Japanese state (gaikan zai; literally "crime of foreign mischief"). The law applies equally to Japanese and non-Japanese people, while treason in other countries usually applies only to their own citizens. Technically there are two laws, one for the crime of inviting foreign mischief (Japan Criminal Code section 2 clause 81) and the other for supporting foreign mischief once a foreign force has invaded Japan. "Mischief" can be anything from invasion to espionage. Before World War II, Imperial Japan had a crime similar to the English crime of high treason (Taigyaku zai), which applied to anyone who harmed the Japanese emperor or imperial family. This law was abolished by the American occupation force after World War II.

The application of "Crimes Related to Insurrection" to the Aum Shinrikyo cult of religious terrorists was proposed from lawyers of a defendant who was a high-ranked subordinate so that the cult leader solely would be deemed as responsible. The court rejected this argument.

New Zealand
New Zealand has treason laws that are stipulated under the Crimes Act 1961. Section 73 of the Crimes Act reads as follows:
Every one owing allegiance to Her Majesty the Queen in right of New Zealand commits treason who, within or outside New Zealand,—
(a) Kills or wounds or does grievous bodily harm to Her Majesty the Queen, or imprisons or restrains her; or
(b) Levies war against New Zealand; or
(c) Assists an enemy at war with New Zealand, or any armed forces against which New Zealand forces are engaged in hostilities, whether or not a state of war exists between New Zealand and any other country; or
(d) Incites or assists any person with force to invade New Zealand; or
(e) Uses force for the purpose of overthrowing the New Zealand Government; or
(f) Conspires with any person to do anything mentioned in this section.

The penalty is life imprisonment, except for conspiracy, for which the maximum sentence is 14 years' imprisonment. Treason was the last capital crime in New Zealand law: the death penalty for the offence was not revoked until 1989, 28 years after it was abolished for murder.

Very few people have been prosecuted for the act of treason in New Zealand, and none have been prosecuted in recent years.

Norway
Article 85 of the Constitution of Norway states that "[a]ny person who obeys an order the purpose of which is to disturb the liberty and security of the Storting [Parliament] is thereby guilty of treason against the country."

Russia
Article 275 of the Criminal Code of Russia defines treason as "espionage, disclosure of state secrets, or any other assistance rendered to a foreign State, a foreign organization, or their representatives in hostile activities to the detriment of the external security of the Russian Federation, committed by a citizen of the Russian Federation." The sentence is imprisonment for 12 to 20 years. It is not a capital offence, even though murder and some aggravated forms of attempted murder are (although Russia currently has a moratorium on the death penalty). Subsequent sections provide for further offences against state security, such as armed rebellion and forcible seizure of power.

South Korea 
According to Article 87 of the Criminal Code of South Korea, "a person who creates a violence for the purpose of usurping the national territory or subverting the Constitution" can be found guilty of insurrection. The punishments for insurrection are as follows:
 "Ring Leader": death, imprisonment for life or imprisonment without prison labor for life.
 "A person who participates in a plot, or commands, or engages in other essential activities": death, imprisonment for life, imprisonment or imprisonment without prison labor, for not less than five years.
 "A person who has committed acts of killing, wounding, destroying or plundering": death, imprisonment for life, imprisonment or imprisonment without prison labor, for not less than five years.
 "A person who merely responds to the agitation and follows the lead of another or merely joins in the violence":  imprisonment or imprisonment without prison labor for not more than five years.

Sweden
Sweden's treason laws are divided into three parts; Högförräderi (High treason), Landsförräderi (Treason) and Landssvek (Treachery).

High treason means crimes committed with the intent to put the Nation, or parts thereof, under foreign rule or influence. It is governed by Brottsbalken (Criminal Code) chapter 19 paragraph 1.

A person who, with intent that the country or a part of it will, by violent or otherwise illegal means or with foreign assistance, be subjugated by a foreign power or made dependent on such a power, or that, in this way, a part of the country will be detached, undertakes an action that involves danger of this intent being realised is guilty of high treason and is sentenced to imprisonment for a fixed term of at least ten and at most eighteen years, or for life or, if the danger was minor, to imprisonment for at least four and at most ten years.

A person who, with intent that a measure or decision of the Head of State, the Government, the Riksdag or the supreme courts will be forced or impeded with foreign assistance, undertakes an action that involves danger of this is also guilty of high treason.

Treason is only applicable when the nation is at war and involves crimes committed with the intent of hindering, misguiding or betraying the defence of the Nation. It is governed by Brottsbalken chapter 22 paragraph 1.

A person who, when the country is at war:

1. impedes, misleads or betrays others who are engaged in the country’s defence, or induces them to mutiny, disloyalty or dejection;

2. betrays, destroys or damages property of importance for the total defence;

3. obtains personnel, property or services for the enemy; or

4. commits another similar treacherous act,

is, if the act is liable to result in considerable detriment to the total defence, or includes considerable assistance to the enemy, guilty of treason and is sentenced to imprisonment for a fixed term of at least four and at most ten years, or for life.

Treachery is a lesser form of Treason, where the intended effects are less severe. It is governed by Brottsbalken chapter 22 paragraph 2.

A person who commits an act referred to in Section 1 that is only liable to result in detriment to the total defence to a lesser extent, or includes more minor assistance to the enemy than is stated there, is guilty of treachery and is sentenced to imprisonment for at most six years.

Until 1973 Sweden also had another form of treason called Krigsförräderi (treason at war), which were acts of Treason committed by military personnel. Although Sweden had outlawed capital punishment in peace time in 1922, this type of treason carried the death penalty until 1973.

Some media reported that four teenagers (their names were not reported) were convicted of treason after they assaulted King Carl XVI Gustaf of Sweden by throwing a cake on his face on 6 September 2001. In reality they were however not convicted of treason but of Högmålsbrott, translated as Treasonable offence in English, which in Swedish criminal law are acts with the intent to overthrow the Form of Government, or impede or hinder the Government, the Riksdag, the Supreme Court or the Head of State. The law also prohibits the use of force against the King or any member of the Royal Family. It is governed by Brottsbalken chapter 18. They were fined between 80 and 100 days' income.

Switzerland
There is no single crime of treason in Swiss law; instead, multiple criminal prohibitions apply. Article 265 of the Swiss Criminal Code prohibits "high treason" (Hochverrat/haute trahison) as follows:
Whoever commits an act with the objective of violently
– changing the constitution of the Confederation or of a canton,
– removing the constitutional authorities of the state from office or making them unable to exercise their authority,
– separating Swiss territory from the Confederation or territory from a canton,
shall be punished with imprisonment of no less than a year.

A separate crime is defined in article 267 as "diplomatic treason" (Diplomatischer Landesverrat/Trahison diplomatique):
1. Whoever makes known or accessible a secret, the preservation of which is required in the interest of the Confederation, to a foreign state or its agents, (...) shall be punished with imprisonment of no less than a year.
2. Whoever makes known or accessible a secret, the preservation of which is required in the interest of the Confederation, to the public, shall be punished with imprisonment of up to five years or a monetary penalty.

In 1950, in the context of the Cold War, the following prohibition of "foreign enterprises against the security of Switzerland" was introduced as article 266bis:
1 Whoever, with the purpose of inciting or supporting foreign enterprises aimed against the security of Switzerland, enters into contact with a foreign state or with foreign parties or other foreign organizations or their agents, or makes or disseminates untrue or tendentious claims (unwahre oder entstellende Behauptungen / informations inexactes ou tendancieuses), shall be punished with imprisonment of up to five years or a monetary penalty.
2 In grave cases the judge may pronounce a sentence of imprisonment of no less than a year.

The criminal code also prohibits, among other acts, the suppression or falsification of legal documents or evidence relevant to the international relations of Switzerland (art. 267, imprisonment of no less than a year) and attacks against the independence of Switzerland and incitement of a war against Switzerland (art. 266, up to life imprisonment).

The Swiss military criminal code contains additional prohibitions under the general title of "treason", which also apply to civilians, or which in times of war civilians are also (or may by executive decision be made) subject to. These include espionage or transmission of secrets to a foreign power (art. 86); sabotage (art. 86a); "military treason", i.e., the disruption of activities of military significance (art. 87); acting as a franc-tireur (art. 88); disruption of military action by disseminating untrue information (art. 89); military service against Switzerland by Swiss nationals (art. 90); or giving aid to the enemy (art. 91). The penalties for these crimes vary, but include life imprisonment in some cases.

Turkey
Treason per se is not defined in the Turkish Penal Code. However, the law defines crimes which are traditionally included in the scope of treason, such as cooperating with the enemy during wartime. Treason is punishable by imprisonment up to life.

Ukraine
Article 111, paragraph 1, of the Ukrainian Criminal Code (adopted in 2001) states:

Articles 109 to 114 set out other offences against the state, such as sabotage.

United Kingdom

The British law of treason is entirely statutory and has been so since the Treason Act 1351 (25 Edw. 3 St. 5 c. 2). The Act is written in Norman French, but is more commonly cited in its English translation.

The Treason Act 1351 has since been amended several times, and currently provides for four categories of treasonable offences, namely:

 "when a man doth compass or imagine the death of our lord the King, or of our lady his Queen or of their eldest son and heir" (following the Succession to the Crown Act 2013 this is read to mean the eldest child and heir);
 "if a man do violate the King's companion, or the King's eldest daughter unmarried, or the wife of the King's eldest son and heir" (following the Succession to the Crown Act 2013 this is read to mean the eldest son if the heir);
 "if a man do levy war against our lord the King in his realm, or be adherent to the King's enemies in his realm, giving to them aid and comfort in the realm, or elsewhere"; and
 "if a man slea [slay] the chancellor, treasurer, or the King's justices of the one bench or the other, justices in eyre, or justices of assise, and all other justices assigned to hear and determine, being in their places, doing their offices".

Another Act, the Treason Act 1702 (1 Anne stat. 2 c. 21), provides for a fifth category of treason, namely:

 "if any person or persons ... shall endeavour to deprive or hinder any person who shall be the next in succession to the crown ... from succeeding after the decease of her Majesty (whom God long preserve) to the imperial crown of this realm and the dominions and territories thereunto belonging".

By virtue of the Treason Act 1708, the law of treason in Scotland is the same as the law in England, save that in Scotland the slaying of the Lords of Session and Lords of Justiciary and counterfeiting the Great Seal of Scotland remain treason under sections 11 and 12 of the Treason Act 1708 respectively. Treason is a reserved matter about which the Scottish Parliament is prohibited from legislating. Two acts of the former Parliament of Ireland passed in 1537 and 1542 create further treasons which apply in Northern Ireland.

The penalty for treason was changed from death to a maximum of imprisonment for life under the Crime and Disorder Act 1998. Before 1998, the death penalty was mandatory, subject to the royal prerogative of mercy. Since the abolition of the death penalty for murder in 1965 an execution for treason was unlikely to have been carried out.

Treason laws were used against Irish insurgents before Irish independence. However, members of the Provisional IRA and other militant republican groups were not prosecuted or executed for treason for levying war against the British government during the Troubles. They, along with members of loyalist paramilitary groups, were jailed for murder, violent crimes or terrorist offences. William Joyce ("Lord Haw-Haw") was the last person to be put to death for treason, in 1946. (On the following day Theodore Schurch was executed for treachery, a similar crime, and was the last man to be executed for a crime other than murder in the UK.)

As to who can commit treason, it depends on the ancient notion of allegiance. As such, all British nationals (but not other Commonwealth citizens) owe allegiance to the sovereign in right of the United Kingdom wherever they may be, as do Commonwealth citizens and aliens present in the United Kingdom at the time of the treasonable act (except diplomats and foreign invading forces), those who hold a British passport however obtained, and aliens who have lived in Britain and departed, but leaving behind family and belongings.

International influence
The Treason Act 1695 enacted, among other things, a rule that treason could be proved only in a trial by the evidence of two witnesses to the same offence. Nearly one hundred years later this rule was incorporated into the U.S. Constitution, which requires two witnesses to the same overt act. It also provided for a three-year time limit on bringing prosecutions for treason (except for assassinating the king), another rule which has been imitated in some common law countries.

The Sedition Act 1661 made it treason to imprison, restrain or wound the king. Although this law was repealed in the United Kingdom in 1998, it still continues to apply in some Commonwealth countries.

United States

The offense of treason exists at both federal and state levels. The federal crime is defined in the Constitution as either levying war against the United States or adhering to its enemies, and carries a sentence of death or imprisonment and fine.

In the 1790s, opposition political parties were new and not fully accepted. Government leaders often considered their opponents to be traitors. Historian Ron Chernow reports that Secretary of the Treasury Alexander Hamilton and President George Washington "regarded much of the criticism fired at their administration as disloyal, even treasonous, in nature." When the undeclared Quasi-War broke out with France in 1797–98, "Hamilton increasingly mistook dissent for treason and engaged in hyperbole." Furthermore, the Jeffersonian opposition party behaved the same way. After 1801, with a peaceful transition in the political party in power, the rhetoric of "treason" against political opponents diminished.

Federal
To avoid the abuses of the English law, the scope of treason was specifically restricted in the United States Constitution. Article III, section 3 reads as follows:

The Constitution does not itself create the offense; it only restricts the definition (the first paragraph), permits the United States Congress to create the offense, and restricts any punishment for treason to only the convicted (the second paragraph). The crime is prohibited by legislation passed by Congress. Therefore, the United States Code at  states: 

The requirement of testimony of two witnesses was inherited from the British Treason Act 1695.

However, Congress has passed laws creating related offenses that punish conduct that undermines the government or the national security, such as sedition in the 1798 Alien and Sedition Acts, or espionage and sedition in the Espionage Act of 1917, which do not require the testimony of two witnesses and have a much broader definition than Article Three treason. Some of these laws are still in effect. The well-known spies Julius and Ethel Rosenberg were charged with conspiracy to commit espionage, rather than treason.

Historical cases
In the United States, Benedict Arnold's name is considered synonymous with treason due to his collaboration with the British during the American Revolutionary War. This, however, occurred before the Constitution was written. Arnold became a general in the British Army, which protected him.

Since the Constitution came into effect, there have been fewer than 40 federal prosecutions for treason and even fewer convictions. Several men were convicted of treason in connection with the 1794 Whiskey Rebellion but were pardoned by President George Washington.

Burr trial

The most famous treason trial, that of Aaron Burr in 1807, resulted in acquittal. In 1807, on a charge of treason, Burr was brought to trial before the United States Circuit Court at Richmond, Virginia. The only physical evidence presented to the grand jury was General James Wilkinson's so-called letter from Burr, which proposed the idea of stealing land in the Louisiana Purchase. The trial was presided over by Chief Justice of the United States John Marshall, acting as a circuit judge. Since no witnesses testified, Burr was acquitted in spite of the full force of Jefferson's political influence thrown against him. Immediately afterward, Burr was tried on a misdemeanor charge and was again acquitted.

Civil War
During the American Civil War, treason trials were held in Indianapolis against Copperheads for conspiring with the Confederacy against the United States. In addition to treason trials, the federal government passed new laws that allowed prosecutors to try people for the charge of disloyalty.

Various legislation was passed, including the Conspiracies Act of July 31, 1861.  Because the law defining treason in the constitution was so strict, new legislation was necessary to prosecute defiance of the government.  Many of the people indicted on charges of conspiracy were not taken to trial, but instead were arrested and detained.

In addition to the Conspiracies Act of July 31, 1861, in 1862, the federal government went further to redefine treason in the context of the civil war. The act that was passed is entitled "An Act to Suppress Insurrection; to punish Treason and Rebellion, to seize and confiscate the Property of Rebels, and for other purposes". It is colloquially referred to as the "second Confiscation Act".  The act essentially lessened the punishment for treason.  Rather than have death as the only possible punishment for treason, the act made it possible to give individuals lesser sentences.

Reconstruction
After the Civil War the question was whether the United States government would make indictments for treason against leaders of the Confederate States of America, as many people demanded. Jefferson Davis, the President of the Confederate States, was indicted and held in prison for two years. The indictments were dropped on February 11, 1869, following the blanket amnesty noted below. When accepting Lee's surrender of the Army of Northern Virginia, at Appomattox Courthouse, in April 1865, Gen. Ulysses S. Grant assured all Confederate soldiers and officers a blanket amnesty, provided they returned to their homes and refrained from any further acts of hostility, and subsequently other Union generals issued similar terms of amnesty when accepting Confederate surrenders. All Confederate officials received a blanket amnesty issued by President Andrew Johnson on Christmas Day, 1868.

World War II

In 1949 Iva Toguri D'Aquino was convicted of treason for wartime Radio Tokyo broadcasts (under the name of "Tokyo Rose") and sentenced to ten years, of which she served six. As a result of prosecution witnesses having lied under oath, she was pardoned in 1977.

In 1952 Tomoya Kawakita, a Japanese-American dual citizen was convicted of treason and sentenced to death for having worked as an interpreter at a Japanese POW camp and having mistreated American prisoners. He was recognized by a former prisoner at a department store in 1946 after having returned to the United States. The sentence was later commuted to life imprisonment and a $10,000 fine. He was released and deported in 1963.

Cold War and after
The Cold War saw frequent talk linking treason with support for Communist-led causes. The most memorable of these came from Senator Joseph McCarthy, who used rhetoric about the Democrats as guilty of "twenty years of treason". As chosen chair of the Senate Permanent Investigations Subcommittee, McCarthy also investigated various government agencies for Soviet spy rings; however, he acted as a political fact-finder rather than a criminal prosecutor. The Cold War period saw no prosecutions for explicit treason, but there were convictions and even executions for conspiracy to commit espionage on behalf of the Soviet Union, such as in the Julius and Ethel Rosenberg case.

On October 11, 2006, the United States government charged Adam Yahiye Gadahn for videos in which he appeared as a spokesman for al-Qaeda and threatened attacks on American soil. He was killed on January 19, 2015, in an unmanned aircraft (drone) strike in Waziristan, Pakistan.

Treason against U.S. states
Most states have treason provisions in their constitutions or statutes similar to those in the U.S. Constitution. The Extradition Clause specifically defines treason as an extraditable offense.

Thomas Jefferson in 1791 said that any Virginia official who cooperated with the federal Bank of the United States proposed by Alexander Hamilton was guilty of "treason" against the state of Virginia and should be executed.  The Bank opened and no one was prosecuted.

Several persons have been prosecuted for treason on the state level. Thomas Dorr was convicted for treason against the state of Rhode Island for his part in the Dorr Rebellion, but was eventually granted amnesty. John Brown was convicted of treason against the Commonwealth of Virginia for his part in the raid on Harpers Ferry, and was hanged. The Mormon prophet, Joseph Smith, was charged with treason against Missouri along with five others, at first in front of a state military court, but Smith was allowed to escape to Illinois after his case was transferred to a civilian court for trial on charges of treason and other crimes. Smith was then later imprisoned for trial on charges of treason against Illinois, but was murdered by a lynch mob while in jail awaiting trial.

Vietnam
The Constitution of Vietnam proclaims that treason is the most serious crime. It is further regulated in the country's 2015 Criminal Code with the 78th article:

Also, according to the Law on Amnesty amended in November 2018, it is impossible for those convicted for treason to be granted amnesty.

Muslim-majority countries
Early in Islamic history, the only form of treason was seen as the attempt to overthrow a just government or waging war against the State. According to Islamic tradition, the prescribed punishment ranged from imprisonment to the severing of limbs and the death penalty depending on the severity of the crime. However, even in cases of treason the repentance of a person would have to be taken into account.

Currently, the consensus among major Islamic schools is that apostasy (leaving Islam) is considered treason and that the penalty is death; this is supported not in the Quran but in hadith. This confusion between apostasy and treason almost certainly had its roots in the Ridda Wars, in which an army of rebel traitors led by the self-proclaimed prophet Musaylima attempted to destroy the caliphate of Abu Bakr.

In the 19th and early 20th century, the Iranian Cleric Sheikh Fazlollah Noori opposed the Iranian Constitutional Revolution by inciting insurrection against them through issuing fatwas and publishing pamphlets arguing that democracy would bring vice to the country. The new government executed him for treason in 1909.

In Malaysia, it is treason to commit offences against the Yang di-Pertuan Agong's person, or to wage or attempt to wage war or abet the waging of war against the Yang di-Pertuan Agong, a Ruler or Yang di-Pertua Negeri. All these offences are punishable by hanging, which derives from the English treason acts (as a former British colony, Malaysia's legal system is based on English common law).

Algeria

In Algeria, treason is defined as the following:
 attempts to change the regime or actions aimed at incitement
 destruction of territory, sabotage to public and economic utilities
 participation in armed bands or in insurrectionary movements

Bahrain
In Bahrain, plotting to topple the regime, collaborating with a foreign hostile country and threatening the life of the Emir are defined as treason and punishable by death. The State Security Law of 1974 was used to crush dissent that could be seen as treasonous, which was criticised for permitting severe human rights violations in accordance with Article One:

Palestine

In the areas controlled by the Palestinian National Authority, it is treason to give assistance to Israeli troops without the authorization of the Palestinian Authority or to sell land to Jews (irrespective of nationality) or non-Jewish Israeli citizens under the Palestinian Land Laws, as part of the PA's general policy of discouraging the expansion of Israeli settlements. Both crimes are capital offences subject to the death penalty, although the former provision has not often been enforced since the beginning of effective security cooperation between the Israel Defense Forces, Israel Police, and Palestinian National Security Forces since the mid-2000s (decade) under the leadership of Prime Minister Salam Fayyad. Likewise, in the Gaza Strip under the Hamas-led government, any sort of cooperation or assistance to Israeli security forces during military actions is also punishable by death.

Related offences
There are a number of other crimes against the state short of treason:
 Apostasy in Islam, considered treason in Islamic belief
 Compounding treason, dropping a prosecution for treason in exchange for money or money's worth
 Defection, or leaving the country, regarded in some communist countries (especially during the Cold War) as disloyalty to the state
 Espionage or spying
 Lèse majesté, insulting a head of state and a crime in some countries
 Misprision of treason, a crime consisting of the concealment of treason
 Sedition, inciting civil unrest or insurrection, or undermining the government
 Treachery, attacking a state regardless of allegiance
 Treason felony, a British offence tantamount to treason

See also
 Betrayal
 Constructive treason
 Law of majestas
 List of people convicted of treason

Terms for traitors
Ephialtes
Hanjian
Jash (term)
Judas
Malinchism
Mir Jafar
Quisling
Việt gian

References

Further reading
 Ben-Yehuda, Nachman, "Betrayals and Treason. Violations of trust and Loyalty." Westview Press, 2001, 
 Ó Longaigh, Seosamh, "Emergency Law in Independent Ireland, 1922–1948", Four Courts Press, Dublin 2006 
 Philippe Buc, “Civil war and religion in Medieval Japan and Medieval Europe: War for the gods, emotions at death, and treason”, The Indian Economic and Social History Review 57:2 (2020), 1-27.

External links

 British Treason Law
 Permanent Subcommittee on Investigations, Official site

 
National security